Hudson Township is an inactive township in Macon County, in the U.S. state of Missouri.

Hudson Township most likely took its name from the Hudson Land Company.

References

Townships in Missouri
Townships in Macon County, Missouri